The 150 Greatest Indonesian Albums of All Time (In Indonesian : 150 Album Indonesia Terbaik Majalah Rolling Stone) is the best album list according to Rolling Stone Indonesia. The list was published in December 2007 edition.

References 
 Majalah Rolling Stone Indonesia. "150 Albums Indonesia Terbaik Sepanjang Masa". Edisi December 2007

Lists of albums
Rolling Stone